Fort Meade National Cemetery is a United States National Cemetery located near the city of Sturgis in Meade County, South Dakota. Administered by the United States Department of Veterans Affairs, it encompasses . It is maintained by Black Hills National Cemetery.

History
First established on September 24, 1878, by the surviving members of George Armstrong Custer's 7th Cavalry, not long after Fort Meade was constructed. It was named for General George Meade. It has been closed to new interments since the end of World War II.

Fort Meade National Cemetery was placed on the National Register of Historic Places on May 22, 1973.

Noteworthy monuments
 An obelisk monument honors the memory of two soldiers from the 7th Cavalry.

Notable interments

 Private Abram Brant (1849–1878), Medal of Honor recipient for action at the Battle of the Little Bighorn, during the Indian Wars (cenotaph).
 Private Albert Knaak (1840–1897), Medal of Honor recipient for action in Arizona Territory during the Indian Wars.

References

External links
 National Cemetery Administration
 Fort Meade National Cemetery
 Fort Meade Cavalry Museum
 
 
 

Cemeteries in South Dakota
Protected areas of Meade County, South Dakota
United States national cemeteries
Historic American Landscapes Survey in South Dakota
Sturgis, South Dakota
1878 establishments in Dakota Territory